Cascade is a studio album by William Basinski. It was released on 2062 Records on April 28, 2015. The release comes with a download code for The Deluge. It peaked at number 4 on Billboards New Age Albums chart.

Critical reception

At Metacritic, which assigns a weighted average score out of 100 to reviews from mainstream critics, the album received an average score of 80, based on 8 reviews, indicating "generally favorable reviews".

Ian King of PopMatters gave the album 8 out of 10 stars, saying, "The piece is so gradual that when the curtain finally does fall the phantom of that piano loop lingers in the ears for long after." Meanwhile, Brian Howe of Pitchfork gave the album a 7.4 out of 10, saying, "it has endless variation at the micro level, which creates the sense of a paradox—repetition that is impossible to grasp, slipping ceaselessly through your fingers."

Fact placed it at number 40 on the "50 Best Albums of 2015" list.

Track listing

Personnel
Credits adapted from the liner notes.

 William Basinski – piano, tape loop
 Preston Wendel – engineering
 Denis Blackham – mastering
 James Elaine – drawings
 Richard Chartier – design

Charts

References

External links
 
 

2015 albums
William Basinski albums